George Higinbotham (19 April 1826 – 31 December 1892) was a politician and was a Chief Justice of the Supreme Court of Victoria, which is the highest ranking court in the Australian colony (and later, State) of Victoria.

Early life
George Higinbotham was the sixth son (and youngest of eight) of Henry Higinbotham, a merchant in Dublin, and Sarah Wilson, daughter of Joseph Wilson, a man of Scottish ancestry who had gone to America and became an American citizen after the War of Independence and returned to Dublin as American consul. George Higinbotham was educated at the Royal School Dungannon, and having gained a Queen's scholarship of £50 a year, entered at Trinity College, Dublin.

Higinbotham qualified for the degree of B.A. in 1849 and M.A. in 1853, after a good but undistinguished course, and proceeded to London where he soon became a parliamentary reporter on the Morning Chronicle. Higinbotham entered himself as a student at Lincoln's Inn on 20 April 1848, and on 6 June 1853 was called to the bar.

Move to Australia
On 1 December 1853 Higinbotham left Liverpool for Australia on the Briseis and arrived at Melbourne on 10 March 1854, where he contributed to the Melbourne Herald and practised at the bar with much success. In 1857 he became editor of the Melbourne Argus, but resigned in 1859 and returned to the bar. He was elected to the Victorian Legislative Assembly in May 1861 for Brighton as an independent Liberal, was rejected at the general election of July the same year, but was returned nine months later.

Attorney-General
In June 1863, Higinbotham became attorney-general in the Sir James McCulloch government. Under his influence measures were passed through the legislative assembly of a somewhat extreme character, completely ignoring the rights of the Victorian Legislative Council, and the government was carried on without any Appropriation Act for more than a year. Higinbotham, by his eloquence and earnestness, obtained great influence amongst the members of the legislative assembly, but his colleagues were not prepared to follow him as far as he desired to go.
In April 1866, a conference of representatives of the two houses was held. Sir Charles Darling the governor had, however, in a dispatch forwarded in the previous December, used a phrase which suggested that he was allying himself with one of the parties to the dispute and was recalled. Higinbotham in his speech made in May 1866 on Darling's treatment declared that the real reason of his recall was that he had "assented to acts of his ministers which Cardwell (secretary of state for the colonies) declares to be illegal".
Higinbotham contended that in a constitutional colony like Victoria the secretary of state for the colonies had no right to fetter the discretion of the queen's representative.

In January 1865, the visit of the U.S. confederate cruiser CSS Shenandoah placed the government in a difficult position, and it has sometimes been assumed that the advice of Higinbotham (to not support the U.S. consul's request that the ship be seized as a pirate) as attorney-general must have been faulty in view of the subsequent arbitration proceedings going in favour of the United States. The voting, however, of the arbitrators was three to two, and one of the three appears to have given his decision with some hesitation. Higinbotham did not return to power with his chief, Sir James McCulloch, after the defeat of the short-lived Sladen administration; and being defeated for Brighton at the next general election by a comparatively unknown man, Sir Thomas Bent, he devoted himself to his practice at the bar.

In September 1866, a royal commission on education was appointed of which Higinbotham was made chairman. The work of the commission was done with great thoroughness and economy, and their recommendations were unanimous. Unfortunately one religious body had refused to be represented on the commission, and the feeling that arose caused the work that had been done to be nullified for the time being. 
In July 1868, McCulloch became premier again, but Higinbotham would accept only a subordinate position in the cabinet. He became vice-president of the board of land and works without salary. 
In February 1869, he resigned that position and never held office again. Later on in the year, in response to a request that representatives of the colony should be sent to a conference on colonial affairs in London, Higinbotham moved and succeeded in carrying five resolutions declining to send representatives, and repeating his views that the internal affairs of a colony are its own concern and that the colonial office should only look after matters that effect the whole empire. A year later at the election for Brighton held in March 1871 Higinbotham was defeated by 14 votes. It was a contest between a realist and an idealist. His opponent, Thomas Bent, was a man who understood the art of looking after his own constituency. Higinbotham cared nothing for its special needs and thought only of the good of the whole colony. He welcomed his release from the bickerings of politics and for two years built up his position as a barrister.

Among his other labours as attorney-general, Higinbotham had codified all the statutes which were in force throughout the colony. In May 1873 he was returned to the legislative assembly for East Bourke Boroughs, resigning in January 1876.

Judge
In 1880 Higinbotham was appointed a puisne judge of the Supreme Court, and in 1886, on the retirement of Sir William Stawell, he was promoted to the office of chief justice. Higinbotham was appointed president of the International Exhibition held at Melbourne in 1888–1889, but did not take any active part in its management. One of his latest public acts was to subscribe a sum of £10, 10s. a week towards the funds of the strikers in the great Australian labour dispute of 1890, an act which did not meet with general approval.

Women's rights
Higinbotham was a champion for women's rights from the beginning of his parliamentary career, when he proposed the Married Women's Property Bill and was posthumously lauded by the Women's Political Association of Victoria for proposing women's suffrage in 1869.

He is mentioned as an exception to typical men of the nineteenth century as a "legislator of unusual wisdom for that era" in Henrietta Dugdale's utopian novel "A Few Hours In A Far Off Age".

Death

Higinbotham died at South Yarra, Melbourne, on 31 December 1892, and was survived by his wife, two sons and three daughters. He had a private funeral at his own request.

Commemoration
 
There is a bronze statue to him outside the Old Treasury Building, MacArthur Street in Melbourne.

See also
 Judiciary of Australia
 List of Judges of the Supreme Court of Victoria

References

Attribution:

Sources
Gwyneth M. Dow, 'Higinbotham, George (1826 - 1892)', Australian Dictionary of Biography, Volume 4, MUP, 1972, pp 391–397. Retrieved on 26 April 2009

External links
 Supreme Court of Victoria Website
 George Higinbotham (1826-1892) Gravesite at Brighton General Cemetery (Vic)

1826 births
1892 deaths
Chief Justices of Victoria
People educated at the Royal School Dungannon
Members of the Victorian Legislative Assembly
Attorneys-General of the Colony of Victoria
Journalists from Dublin (city)
Australian newspaper editors
19th-century Australian journalists
Male journalists
19th-century Australian male writers
Colony of Victoria judges
19th-century Australian politicians
Irish emigrants to colonial Australia
The Argus (Melbourne) people
Judges from Melbourne
Politicians from Melbourne
Alumni of Trinity College Dublin